Danny Jeffrey Vanan (born 21 December 1992) is a Surinamese sprinter. He competed in the 100 metres event at the 2015 World Championships in Athletics in Beijing, China.

References

External links
 

1992 births
Living people
Surinamese male sprinters
Competitors at the 2014 Central American and Caribbean Games
Competitors at the 2018 Central American and Caribbean Games
World Athletics Championships athletes for Suriname
Place of birth missing (living people)